Tanya Harford (born 28 November 1958) is a retired South African tennis player.

In 1981 she won the doubles title at the French Open together with compatriot Rosalyn Fairbank. In the final they defeated Candy Reynolds and Paula Smith in straight sets. Her best result at the Wimbledon Championships was reaching the third round in the singles in 1980 and 1982 as well as the semifinal in the doubles and the quarterfinal in the mixed doubles event.

In 1976 she was a runner-up at the Irish Open. Harford reached the final of the South African Open in 1979 but lost in straight sets to Brigitte Cuypers. With Fairbank she won the doubles title at the WTA Swiss Open in 1981.

She served as chair for the Joburg Gay Pride Festival Company, which was organizing the Johannesburg gay pride parade until the dissolution of the company in April 2013, following controversy over the 2012 edition.

Grand Slam finals

Doubles: 1 (1 title)

Career finals

Singles (1 runner-up)

References

External links
 
 

1958 births
Living people
South African female tennis players
Grand Slam (tennis) champions in women's doubles
Sportspeople from Cape Town
French Open champions
White South African people
20th-century South African women